is a 2006 Japanese film directed by Takashi Miike. The film is a follow-up to Waru.

Cast
Show Aikawa as Youji Himuro
Yoshihiko Hakamada
Ryo Ishibashi
Tamio Kawaji
Hikaru Kawamura
Saki Kurihara
Shion Machida
Hisao Maki
Keiko Matsuzaka
Masumi Okada
Johnny Okura
Hitoshi Ozawa
Atsuko Sakuraba
Satoru Sayama
Hideki Sone

External links
 

Films directed by Takashi Miike
2000s Japanese films